Beauchesne's Parliamentary Rules and Forms is a Canadian parliamentary authority. The first edition was published in 1922 by Arthur Beauchesne, Clerk of the House of Commons of Canada from 1925 to 1949.

See also

Standard reference works on Canadian Parliamentary procedure have been written by other Clerks of the House, including
 Sir John George Bourinot
 Robert Marleau

References

Parliamentary authority